This is an incomplete list of mountains in the Andes that are known to have had pre-Columbian ascents. It is divided into those peaks for which there is direct evidence of an ascent to the summit, and those peaks where evidence has been found only at a lower altitude on the mountain. Ascents were made for religious purposes by groups affiliated with the Inca Empire. These ascents sometimes involved the ritual child sacrifice known as qhapaq hucha.

Mountains with known ascents to the summit

Mountains with evidence found at high altitude

References

 Beorchia, Antonio: "El enigma de los Santuarios Indigenas de alta montaña" CIADAM - Centro de Investigaciones  Arqueologicas de Alta Montaña, 1984, San Juan.
 Reinhard, Johan The Ice Maiden: Inca Mummies, Mountain Gods, and Sacred Sites in the Andes. 2005, Washington, D.C.: National Geographic Society.
 Reinhard, Johan and Ceruti, María Constanza: "Inca Rituals and Sacred Mountains: A Study of the World's Highest Archaeological Sites" Los Angeles: UCLA, 2010.
 

Andes